Mount Wilson is a mountain located in the Spring Mountain range of southern Nevada. It is located on land managed by the United States Bureau of Land Management as the Red Rock Canyon National Conservation Area, part of the Rainbow Mountain Wilderness Area. It is the highest peak in the Red Rock Canyon National Conservation Area.

Hiking Route 

Mount Wilson's sandstone cliffs are accessible to hikers starting at the First Creek trailhead and proceeding west into First Creek Canyon. From there, at least two distinct and strenuous third-class routes lead to the summit.

References

External links 

 
 

Spring Mountains
Climbing areas of Nevada
Mountains of Nevada
Protected areas of the Mojave Desert
Mountains of Clark County, Nevada